Spys was an American rock band formed in New York City in 1981 by Al Greenwood and Ed Gagliardi, who had been keyboardist and bassist, respectively, of Foreigner. They signed with EMI Records and released their debut album, Spys, in 1982, produced by Neil Kernon. The album reached #138 on the Billboard 200 chart and the single "Don't Run My Life" reached #82 on the Billboard Hot 100 and #19 on the Hot Mainstream Rock Tracks chart. A follow-up album, Behind Enemy Lines, was released in 1983, but it did not sell well, and after a contract dispute with the label, the group disbanded.

Members
John Blanco – vocals (1981–1983)
John DiGaudio – guitar (1981–1983)
Al Greenwood – keyboards (1981–1983)
Ed Gagliardi – bass (1981–1983)
Billy Milne – drums (1981–1983)

Discography
Spys (EMI, 1982)
Behind Enemy Lines (EMI, 1983)

References

Musical groups from New York City
American rock music groups
Musical groups established in 1981
Musical groups disestablished in 1983
1981 establishments in New York City
1983 disestablishments in New York (state)
EMI Records artists